Abelardo Dennis Florencio Ho (born May 12, 1981), known professionally as Dennis Trillo, is a Filipino actor, model and recording artist. He is currently a contract star of GMA Network. He was known for his role as Eric del Mundo in the first ever gay-themed series on Philippine TV, My Husband's Lover aired on GMA Network in 2013.

Trillo received his first acting award in 2004 for his role as a cross-dressing spy in the 2004 war film Aishite Imasu 1941: Mahal Kita. In May 2016, he appeared in another primetime television series, Juan Happy Love Story, opposite his Dwarfina leading lady Heart Evangelista.

Now being recognized both locally and internationally, he still continues to work as GMA Network's Drama King.

Personal life
Trillo was born on May 12, 1981, in Quezon City to Florita Florencio Ho, a Filipino, and Abelardo Leslie Ho, a Chinese Filipino from Dumaguete, Negros Oriental. He finished high school at Jose Abad Santos Memorial School, Quezon City and spent his grade school years (grades 1–7) at the Ateneo De Manila University. He pursued a college education at Miriam College and received a B.A. in International Studies.

He has a son with his ex-girlfriend Carlene Aguilar, born in 2007.

In 2021, he married his longtime girlfriend Jennylyn Mercado. They have a daughter named Dylan who was born on April 25, 2022.

Career

Early years
Prior to starting his career in show business, Trillo was once a member of a band called Moyg. For a short period, he played the drums for the DIY band in Baguio. His career in entertainment started in ABS-CBN in 2001 when he was introduced as part of ABS-CBN's Star Circle (now known as Star Magic) batch 10 along with Bea Alonzo, Alfred Vargas and TJ Trinidad. He took part in ABS-CBN's hit television soap operas Pangako Sa 'Yo as Ruel and Sa Dulo Ng Walang Hanggan as Jojo; both were minor characters.

2003–2005: Breakthrough as Kapuso
After transferring to GMA Network and becoming a contract star, he landed his first role for the network in the youth-oriented drama Kahit Kailan where he played a supporting character named David. He was also cast in several outings like Twin Hearts and Love to Love.

In 2004, he had his first main character role in the fantasy show Mulawin. He played Gabriel, a half-human and half-Ravena who became the third wheel in Alwina (Angel Locsin) and Agiluz (Richard Gutierrez) romance. The same year, he had his breakthrough performance when he starred in the Metro Manila Film Festival official entry Aishite Imasu 1941: Mahal Kita as a transgender woman during World War II. In this film he received his first acting award as Best Supporting Actor in the 30th Metro Manila Film Festival.

Following this recognition, he received five more Best Actor trophies from the Film Academy of the Philippines, the Filipino Academy of Movie Arts and Sciences (FAMAS), the PMPC Star Awards for Movies, Golden Screen Awards and the Young Critics Circle. He was also included in the third installment of Mano Po.

The following year, 2005, Trillo officially became a leading man when he was paired with Angel Locsin in the television adaptation of the iconic superhero Darna. He also starred in an afternoon family drama Now and Forever: Agos where he received a Best Drama Actor nomination from PMPC Star Awards for TV. That same year, he reprised his role for Mulawin: The Movie, and appeared in the film Blue Moon.

2006–2010: Kapuso leading man and music debut
In 2005, in GMA Network fantasy series Encantadia, Trillo was cast as lead character in Etheria, where he portrayed the Sapirian prince, Raquim. Midway through the series, GMA Network management announced that Trillo would be pulled out from the said show to once again star in another fantasy-themed television series Majika, in the end Trillo was allowed to complete Etheria. He also starred in the horror-suspense film Pamahiin and was included in the network's noontime show SOP as a co-host where he also played drums as part of the show's "Starband".

Trillo released his self-titled debut album in 2007 under IndiMusic. It was in the same year when he made his fourth Lenten drama special for GMA Network under APT Entertainment entitled Unico Hijo. On August 21, 2007, he started taping for the fantasy series Zaido: Pulis Pangkalawakan with Aljur Abrenica and Marky Cielo.

On April 27, 2008, five thousand spectators witnessed the Battle of Mactan play, with Trillo playing Ferdinand Magellan at the Mactan, Cebu Shrine. The same year, Trillo joined the stellar cast of Magdusa Ka, an afternoon soap opera which later earned an International Emmy nomination the following year. Late 2008 when he starred in the comic-based superhero series Gagambino, playing as the main character. The following year after Gagambino, he starred into two more primetime dramas: Adik Sa'Yo and the 2009 remake of Darna.

Trillo's hosting roles continued when he replaced Dingdong Dantes as a co-host in the new installment of StarStruck V in 2009. In 2010, he also began co-hosting the variety show, Party Pilipinas. He appeared in Sine Novela Presents: Gumapang Ka Sa Lusak opposite Jennylyn Mercado and portrayed Andrew Tantoco in the Philippine adaptation of the hit Korean series Endless Love.

2011–present: GMA's Drama King; My Husband's Lover

In 2011, Trillo appeared in the romantic-fantasy series Dwarfina where he teamed-up with Heart Evangelista. After playing the lead role in the Philippine adaptation of Temptation of Wife, Trillo lead his most controversial role to date as Eric del Mundo in his second International Emmy nominee drama series My Husband's Lover where he received one acting award from two nominations and a commendation from Asian TV Awards.

After the success of the series, the cast of My Husband's Lover held a concert at Araneta Coliseum named "One More Try: My Husband's Lover The Concert". The same year, Trillo and his screen partner Tom Rodriguez released their album titled TomDen, which is now a certified Platinum record according to the PARI with over 15,000 copies sold.

In 2014, he top-billed the Primetime drama series Hiram na Alaala with Kapuso actress Kris Bernal. He also had a weekly medical drama with Bela Padilla entitled Sa Puso ni Dok under GMA News & Public Affairs department. Trillo visited ABS-CBN via his guesting in Kris TV to promote his 2015 movie You're Still The One alongside Maja Salvador, Ellen Adarna and Richard Yap under Regal Entertainment Inc. and Star Cinema. The same year, Trillo launched his first VIVA Films movie, Felix Manalo where he received a Movie Actor of the Year award from PMPC Star Awards for Movies.

After doing several heavy drama soap operas, Trillo starred in 2016 in a light drama series with Heart Evangelista in Juan Happy Love Story.

In 2021, Dennis starred in the cultural drama series Legal Wives where he played the role of a Muslim with Alice Dixson, Andrea Torres, and Bianca Umali.

Dennis starred in Erik Matti;s crime thriller film, On the Job The: Missing 8 in 2021. He played the role of Roman, a prisoner who is temporarily freed from prison to perform assassinations. For this film, Dennis wore a prosthetic over his nose, making it appear disfigured to immerse himself in his character.

In 2022, he stars as Crisostomo Ibarra, the main character in Jose Rizal's novels, Noli Me Tangere and El Filibusterismo in Maria Clara at Ibarra.

Discography

Albums

Studio albums
 Dennis Trillo (2007, IndiMusic)

Collaboration albums
 TomDen (with Tom Rodriguez) (2013, GMA Records) (PARI Certification: Platinum)

Compilation appearances
 Seasons of Love (2014, GMA Records)
Track 6: "Tibok ng Puso"

Singles
 "All About Love" (2007)
 "Lumilipad" (2007)
 "Hinahanap-Hanap Kita" (Adik Sa'Yo theme song) (2009)
 "Forever" (with Tom Rodriguez) (2014)
 "Kailan Man" (A 100-Year Legacy theme song) (2014)
 "Tibok ng Puso" (Sa Puso ni Dok theme song) (2014)
 "Sa Iyo na Lang Ako" (Hiram na Alaala theme song) (2014)
 "Overdrive" (Lakbay 2 Love theme song) (with Solenn Heussaff) (2016)

Filmography

Television

Television series

Television shows

Drama anthologies

TV specials

Film

Accolades

References

External links
 
 Dennis Trillo - GMA homepage

1981 births
Living people
Filipino male television actors
Filipino male film actors
Ateneo de Manila University alumni
21st-century Filipino male actors
Filipino television personalities
21st-century Filipino male singers
Filipino male models
Filipino television variety show hosts
Filipino male comedians
People from Quezon City
Male actors from Metro Manila
Filipino people of Chinese descent
Miriam College alumni
GMA Network personalities
GMA Music artists
Viva Artists Agency